The Federal Service for State Registration, Cadastre and Cartography (Rosreestr) (prior to December 30, 2008, Federal Registration Service) is a federal agency in Russia, responsible for the organization of the Unified State Register of Rights on Real Estate and Transactions, as well as the spatial data infrastructure of the Russian Federation. It is Russia's official cadastre and cartography agency.

According to the amendments to the list of names and abbreviations of the federal bodies of executive power (the order of the Presidential Administration of Russia and the Government of Russia of July 16, 2008 № 943/788) of 2 March 2009 number P41-6596 abbreviation of the Federal Service for State Registration, Cadastre and Cartography - Rosreestr.

See also
 
 
 
 Corps of Military Topographers of the Russian Imperial Army

References

Government of Russia
Real estate in Russia
Surveying organizations
Public administration
Cartography organizations